Gajab Desh Ki Ajab Kahaniyaan is an Indian television show hosted by actress and item girl Rakhi Sawant and created by UTV Software Communications which air on NDTV Imagine. Rakhi will be seen in the second season of her earlier show Rakhi Ka Insaaf on Imagine TV. The show will bear a new title. Going by the name, on the show Rakhi will be hearing and solving out some bizarre cases of a particular celebrity and a common man. Unlike the last season of Rakhi Ka Insaaf, which was on some very serious note and controversies, this show will be more on a lighter and comical note.

Show concept
The show will consist of one-hour episodes where Rakhi Sawant will interview a celebrity who is attached to controversies. In that same episode Sawant will include a very small feature of some bizarre cases in India.

Critical response
The leading newspaper Indian Express reviewed the show by thrashing: "huge waste of time and effort, ours that is, to even try to see it." Deccan Chronicle reviewed it by calling it "A Show that Rejects Talents."

References

Indian television series
2012 Indian television series endings
UTV Television
2011 Indian television series debuts